Peramodon is an extinct genus of dicynodont therapsid from the Late Permian Scutosaurus karpinskii Zone of the Salarevo Formation of Russia. The type species, P. amalitzkii, was first named in 1926 as Dicynodon amalitzkii.

References 

Dicynodonts
Lopingian synapsids of Europe
Fossils of Russia
Fossil taxa described in 2011
Anomodont genera